Baltia is a Palearctic genus of butterflies in the family Pieridae. The genus was erected by Frederic Moore in 1878. The three species are found in the Himalayas.

Species
Baltia butleri (Moore, 1882)
Baltia shawi (H. Bates, 1873)
Baltia sikkima Fruhstorfer, 1903

References

Pierini
Pieridae genera
Taxa named by Frederic Moore